Blossom is a fictional character that serves as one of the three major protagonists of The Powerpuff Girls franchise, making her first appearance in the Whoopass Stew (1994) pilot and fully being introduced in The Powerpuff Girls (1998). The character was introduced as the tactician and self-proclaimed leader and the most mature of the Powerpuff Girls (alongside Bubbles and Buttercup). She is portrayed as the most level-headed, intelligent, and composed member of the group and also the strongest and most determined. She has red waist-length hair with bangs in a triangular part, decorated with a red bow and a pink hair clip with a red heart. Her unique abilities include ice breath, microscopic vision, lightning bolts, and advanced intelligence.

A toy line and series of video games featuring the character as the primary protagonist have also been produced.

Creation

Design
Blossom and her sisters all have oval-shaped heads, abnormally large eyes (inspired by Margaret Keane's art), stubby arms and legs, flat feet with toes, and lack noses, ears, fingers, and necks (McCracken preferred her to look more symbolic of an actual girl rather than going for a "realistic" look, meaning fewer body parts were needed). They wear dresses that match the colors of their eyes, decorated with black stripes. They also wear white tights and black Mary Janes. In the original pilot for The Powerpuff Girls, the substance that accidentally creates the Powerpuff Girls is a can of "Whoopass", which was replaced by "Chemical X" in the aired version.

Voice actors
The character has had a total of sixteen voice actors for different regions and series, being voiced by Emiri Katō in the Japanese dub of Powerpuff Girls Z.

Before the 2016 series aired, Cathy Cavadini, Blossom's original voice actor, was displeased to learn that her role had been recast with Amanda Leighton. Tara Strong called the decision "a stab in the heart" on Twitter. Strong had announced after the upfront in February that this was a "strictly creative" decision by the network, though in June of the same year said that the network had never contacted any of the three actresses who voiced the original Powerpuff Girls prior to the decision to recast. In an interview with The Comic Book Cast in May 2015, Tom Kenny claimed that Craig McCracken "does give it his blessing", but in May 2016 McCracken denied doing so on his Twitter posts, commenting that he had never given the new reboot his official blessing. McCracken said that he wished that Cartoon Network had stopped their plans for a reboot of the original Powerpuff Girls property but also acknowledged from a financial view why the new series was commissioned. However, at the 2017 New York Comic Con, Strong stated that she had no ill will towards the new cast and had given the show her blessing.

Portrayal
In March 2021, Chloe Bennet was cast as Blossom's adult counterpart in the live-action The CW television series Powerpuff. However in August, Bennet quit the project.

Appearances

In The Powerpuff Girls (1998–2005)

In the 1998 series Blossom (voiced by Cathy Cavadini) is the 'Commander and Leader' of the Powerpuff Girls. She has long, waist length red hair, blunt bangs, and pink eyes. Her attire consists of a pink dress with a black stripe across the middle, white tights, and Mary Janes. On top of her head is a signature red bow she is rarely seen without alongside a heart shaped hair clip from behind. Blossom is considered the smartest and most logical of the trio, coming up with most of their battleplans, and is considered a natural born tactician. While mentally the most mature, composed, and level headed she also has tendencies towards fussiness, vanity, overly analyzation, and can be annoyingly overbearing towards Buttercup and Bubbles. As leader, she often mediates between the two but frequently butts heads with Buttercup due to their contrasting natures. Nevertheless, she loves her sisters dearly and will do anything to protect them.

By far the most high minded of the trio and iron clad in her sense of justice, Blossom is not above certain acts of pilfering, however in the few instances she does something wrong (such as stealing golf clubs for the Professor's birthday) she is quick to own up to her wrongdoing. In her spare time, Blossom enjoys reading and academic pursuits, although like most children her age, also enjoys video games, cartoons, playing outside, and junk food. While not as inherently girly as Bubbles, Blossom makes beauty a point of emphasis, especially in taking care of her hair, which is a source of pride.

Her signature color is pink. Her key ingredient is 'everything nice' and her signature power is ice breath. Blossom received her name from the Professor for her honesty and opening right up to him upon their creation. She is the oldest Powerpuff Girl and the first one to speak.

In Powerpuff Girls Z
In Powerpuff Girls Z, the magical girl version of Blossom is named  / Hyper Blossom (ハイパー・ブロッサム Haipā Burossamu) in the original Japanese version while being called Blossom in the English dubbed version. She is depicted as the first member of the Powerpuff Girls Z. She uses a yo-yo as her signature weapon, but she can use her bow as a weapon if she doesn't have her yo-yo. Like the original, she's the self-proclaimed leader of the team. However, she is extremely ditzy, a bit boy-crazy, given to crushes and romantic fantasies. She is very familiar with the mahou shojo genre, along with some typical anime/Super Sentai/Kamen Rider/Pretty Cure concepts and is regarded as a "hero maniac" in school, especially by Buttercup.

Blossom also has a strong appetite for sugary foods. Blossom was the first to encounter Mojo Jojo at the park after buying candy. If she doesn't eat sweets for a long time, she can get very cranky. But she is getting used to it. Although often distracted and has been known to whine, Blossom tries her best to protect New Townsville, lead the girls, and help her friends regardless of her situation. (In one instance, when Blossom is unable to transform, she tries to fight alongside Bubbles and Buttercup wearing a sentai hero mask). Often she can be very clever and crafty when needed, usually being the first to come up with a plan to trick or defeat a monster that the girls are having trouble with. She has a younger sister named Kasey.

In The Powerpuff Girls (2016–2019)
In the 2016 The Powerpuff Girls series, Blossom (voiced by Amanda Leighton) is once again depicted as the leader of the Team. Her appearance is similar to her original counterpart with the exception of her bow, which is more rounded. She loves organization and hates when things are messy and out of order. She has a perfect attendance record and is an overachiever. She can be stubborn at times, but still comes through. She also has ice breath like her 1998 counterpart. Her trail is bright pink with little squares. Her unique abilities are: Ice breath, genius-level intelligence, microscopic vision, natural leadership skills, and intuitive aptitude. She also can project bright pink energy and manipulate it into various household and office items; an ability her 1998 counterpart in the original show does not possess.

Powers and abilities
As depicted in the opening sequence of each episode, the Powerpuff Girls Blossom, Bubbles, and Buttercup were created by Professor Utonium in an attempt to create the "perfect little girl" using a mixture of "sugar, spice, and everything nice". However, he accidentally spilled a mysterious substance called "Chemical X" into the mixture, creating three girls and granting all three superpowers including flight, superhuman strength, superhuman speed, superhuman senses, nigh-invulnerability, x-ray vision, red heat vision, energy projection, space survivability, and thermal resistance. In the original pilot, the accidental substance was a can of "Whoopass", which was replaced by "Chemical X" in the aired version.

Reception

In a 2000 Entertainment Weekly review, Marc Bernardin complimented Blossom for her "spot-on pop-culture acumen" and "unparalleled sense of fun", giving it a warm welcome from earlier "lame" superhero cartoons that he grew up with. Peter Marks of The New York Times noted the character's use of adult humor and pop culture references, declaring their dialogue as "the sort of playful satire that can appeal as much to a viewer of 37 as 7."

Joly Herman of Common Sense Media praised Blossom's and the Powerpuff Girs' "strange character[isation] funny situations [with] lots of lowbrow humor". Reviewing the 2009 special The Powerpuff Girls Rule!!!, Robert Lloyd of the LA Times described the character as "transgressive" based on little violence but "also cute." The TV Guide collectively chose Blossom, Bubbles and Buttercup as No. 13 in a list of the 50 Greatest cartoon characters of all time.

See also
 List of The Powerpuff Girls characters
 Bliss (The Powerpuff Girls)

References

The Powerpuff Girls characters
Child characters in television
Female characters in animated series
Female characters in anime and manga
Television characters introduced in 1998
Animated characters introduced in 1998
Fictional characters with ice or cold abilities
Fictional characters with fire or heat abilities
Fictional characters with electric or magnetic abilities